The Széchenyi Medicinal Bath in Budapest is the largest medicinal bath in Budapest.

Components of the thermal water include sulfate, calcium, magnesium, bicarbonate and a significant amount of metaboric acid and fluoride.

History
From 1865 to 1875, Vilmos Zsigmondi drilled a hole beneath the park that was 975.36 meters deep(3,200 feet). This would later become the source of thermal water that would supply the spa.

During the planning phase from the 1880s, the bath had originally been referred to as the Artesian spa (Artézi fürdő), but when it opened  on June 16, 1913, it was officially named Széchenyi spa (Széchenyi gyógyfürdő) after István Széchenyi

The bath, located in the City Park, was built in Neo-Baroque style to the design of Győző Czigler. Construction began on May 7, 1909 with designs by architect Eugene Schmitterer. The pool construction cost approximately 3.9 million Austro-Hungarian korona. More than 200,000 bathers visited the spa in 1913. This number increased to 890,507 by 1919. At that time the Bath consisted of private baths, separate steam-bath sections for men and women, and male and female "public baths." The complex was expanded in 1927 to its current size, with 3 outdoor and 15 indoor pools. It is now possible for both sexes to visit the main swimming and thermal sections.

After the expansion, the thermal artesian well could not supply the larger volume of water needed, so a new well was drilled. It supplies  of hot water daily. Between 1999 and 2009 the Széchenyi thermal bath was refurbished in a complete renovation.

Units

The baths have pools of varying temperature. Guests can use the water streaming, whirlpool and massaging water beamand. The complex also includes saunas and steam.

Gallery

References

External links 

 Website
  Budapest Spas and Hot Springs entry
  The experience of visiting Szechenyi and other baths in Budapest

Buildings and structures completed in 1913
Baroque Revival architecture
Thermal baths in Budapest
Széchenyi family
Landmarks in Hungary
1913 establishments in Austria-Hungary